State Highway 46 (SH 46)  is a  state highway in the U.S. state of Texas that runs from SH 16 east of Bandera to the intersection of SH 123 and SH 123 Business just south of Seguin.

History
 SH 46 was originally designated on October 20, 1919 as a route from New Braunfels north to Johnson City. On July 13, 1925, the route had been shortened, with the section north of Spring Branch transferred to SH 108.  This alignment of SH 46 only consisted of the portion from US 281 to US 81 in New Braunfels.  US 81 no longer exists today in favor of I-35 and is known as a business loop of I-35. On July 16, 1928, it extended to Seguin. On July 15, 1935, the section from New Braunfels to Seguin was cancelled. On October 26, 1967, the highway was relocated in New Braunfels to the east along the alignment of Loop 337, but still had an eastern terminus at US 81.  The original alignment in New Braunfels was redesignated as Loop 453, but to be signed as a business route of SH 46. On June 21, 1990, the designation of this segment was officially changed to Business 46.  On February 26, 1968, SH 46 was extended to the south from US 81 to I-35, replacing part of Farm to Market Road 25.  On September 28, 1988, the highway was extended at both ends, extending the eastern end south replacing Farm to Market Road 25 from I-35 to FM 78 and then replacing part of Spur 351 from FM 78 to I-10 in Seguin.  The western terminus was extended to the west replacing Ranch to Market Road 475 from US 281 to SH 16.  A portion of this route had been FM 1719 which had been combined with RM 475 in 1951. On May 14, 1990, the highway was extended to its current alignment when it was extended south from I-10 to SH 123 replacing the remainder of Spur 351.

Spur 351 was designated on June 30, 1961 from FM 25 and FM 78 to US 90A. On August 4, 1970, Spur 351 was extended south to SH 123. On September 28, 1988, the section of Spur 351 from FM 78 to I-10 was transferred to SH 46. On May 14, 1990, the remainder of Spur 351 was cancelled and mileage was transferred to SH 46.

Route description

SH 46 begins at its western terminus at SH 16, east of Bandera in Bandera County.  The highway heads to the northeast, crossing over into Kendall County on its way to Boerne where it intersects with I-10 and US 87.  SH 46 carries the street name of Bandera Road from I-10 until US 87.  At US 87, there is a short break in the highway with SH 46 continuing again further north with the name River Road.  SH 46 leaves the city limits of Boerne to the east and follows an east-northeast routing through rural Kendall County.  An intersection with FM 3351 occurs just prior to heading into Comal County.  Continuing to the east, SH 46 passes FM 2696 before coming into the city of Bulverde.  In Bulverde, SH 46 intersects with US 281 at a diamond interchange, which provides access to San Antonio to the south.  The highway continues to the east-southeast, passing several farm-to-market roads with FM 3159 and RM 2722 providing access to Canyon Lake.  As it enters New Braunfels, Texas, it intersects and becomes concurrent with Loop 337, providing the northern and eastern arcs of the loop around New Braunfels.  In New Braunfels, the highway passes over the Guadalupe River and intersects I-35.  Continuing to the south-southeast, it heads towards Seguin as it passes into Guadalupe County and roughly parallels the Guadalupe River to the east.  In Seguin, SH 46 passes I-10 and US 90 before ending at SH 123 just south of Seguin.

Junction list

New Braunfels business route

Business State Highway 46-C (Bus SH. 46-C) is a business route of SH 46 located in New Braunfels. The highway was designated on June 21, 1990, with the mileage being transferred from Loop 453.

The highway begins at an interchange with SH 46/Loop 337 and runs in a southward direction along Walnut Avenue. Bus. SH 46-C turns towards the east after turning left onto Landa Street. Just outside of downtown, the highway merges onto Seguin Avenue and runs through the central business district of New Braunfels. Near the Comal County Courthouse, Bus. SH 46-C runs along a traffic circle, known locally as Main Plaza, where the highway intersects San Antonio Street. Bus. SH 46-C continues to run southeast along Seguin Street before ending at an intersection with BL I-35/FM 725.

Junction list

References

External links

046
Transportation in Bandera County, Texas
Transportation in Kendall County, Texas
Transportation in Comal County, Texas
Transportation in Guadalupe County, Texas